Hemmige is a small village located near Mysore, India. The village was once home to a sizable population but now consists of less than 30 households. On the banks of the river Kaveri, this village is the site of one of the oldest temples of  Varadaraja, a form of Vishnu.

Legend 

Centuries back, sages Ruchika Muni and Mrigashinga Muni did Tapasya (penance). The Ruchika Muni's ashrama was on the left bank of Cauvery and Mrigashinga Muni's ashram was on the right bank that is now Hemmige
(also called Gajaranya Kshetram also known as Siddha Ashrama Kshetram). Mrigashinga did severe penance to Goddess Bhramrambhika. Appeased with sage's penance, Bhramrambhika (Goddess)appeared before him and asked what he wanted. Sage Mrigashinga asked for Moksha (divine salvation), but the Devi told that her brother Sriman Narayana (Lord Vishnu) alone can give her Moksha. But she also indicated that Her brother Lord Varadharaja is residing in an anthill on the bank of Cauvery and he should do the Prathistapana (establish) and do Pooja (worship) him and then only through him he could attain Moksha. Thereafter, Sage Mrigashinga dug the Ant hill and found a beautiful Moorthy (stone Idol) of Lord Varadharaja with Shanku, Chakra and Gada and with Abhaya Hastha pose with his Consorts Sri Devi and Bhoo Devi seated on Garuda Peetam. Bhramrambhika also gave the sage a golden Vigraham of Hemambika with Shanku, Chakra, and Abhaya Hastha in left hand held Hemadri Hills, because of which the place was known as Hemambika Agrahara and in later days it became Hemmige.

There is another interesting story of how the Perun Devi Thayar came to Hemmige. There lived a lady named Modesinghamma, in whose dream Perundevi thayar appeared and told that she could be found in a small place in Mysore Devaraja Market. Then, Modesinghamma traveled to Mysore and met the Maharaja of Mysore and explained her dream. The Maharaja told her that if the moorthy was found then she could take it to Hemmige. Thus idol of Perun devi Thayar in Padma Peetam was found and taken to Hemmige.

Srivaishanva saints 

Hemmige is also connected with many of the Vishistadvaita saints starting with Ramanuja who stayed here for ten days on his way to Talakad. Vedantha Desika also stayed here for many days before he proceeded to Sathyagala.

Andavan Ashram (Mutt) has a connection with Hemmige from the days of Periya Andavan, Chinna Andavan, KaTAndethi Andavan (Srinivasa Ramanuja Maha Desikan), Nam Andavan, Thembarai Andavan, Akkur Andavan, ThiruKudanthai Andavan who all visited Hemmige for some time and did the Mangala Sasnam of Varadharajar at Sri Varadharaja Swamy Temple.

Hemmige Iyengar 
Hemmige Iyengar is one sub sect among the several subdivisions or subcastes of the Shrivaishnavas; the other subcastes, in alphabetical order, are, Bhattacharya, Embar, Hebbar, Hemmigeyar, Kadambiyar, Kandade, Kilnatar, Mandyattar, Maradurar, Metukunteyar, Morasanad, Muncholi, Nallanchakravarti, Prativadibhayankarattar, Someshandal and Thirumaleyar. The Hemmige iyengars are all Vadakalai and Vaidikas who migrated from Kanchipuram in Tamil Nadu and settled at Hemmige near Talakadu in Mysore District. Lands were granted by the Kings of Mysore to their ancestor several hundreds of years ago, recognizing their scholarship.

References 

Villages in Mysore district